The Turbomeca Astafan is a single-spool, variable-pitch turbofan engine developed from the Turbomeca Astazou. Despite successful flight-testing, an efficient, quiet and clean design (compared to turbojets and conventional turbofans) and some commercial interest, the Astafan never entered series production. The engines were only flown on the Fouga 90 prototype and Turbomeca's two test aircraft.

Design
The engine combines an Astazou-derived centrifugal compressor with up to three axial compressor stages (depending on the version of the engine), driven by a common driveshaft. The fan section is composed of a unique variable pitch fan  and fixed stator blades mounted at the front of the engine. Blade pitch is varied by a hydraulic piston mounted in the fan hub, while the fan itself is powered via a reduction gear from the main driveshaft.

The engine is designed to operate at a constant speed, no matter the thrust output—a characteristic permitted by the Astafan's use of precise fuel metering and fan blade pitch adjustment. To control the engine, the pilot first sets the speed lever, which adjusts fuel flow in proportion to the selected engine speed. Then the pilot moves the thrust lever (analogous to a throttle), actuating the fan pitch piston by way of a mechanical linkage and hydraulic valve, and varying the blade pitch. In response, the speed governor holds engine speed steady by adjusting fuel delivery to the combustor. Additionally, the system automatically protects against excessive fuel delivery or unusual changes in blade pitch. Using the thrust lever, pilots can start an Astafan in fine pitch (for minimal resistive torque), select takeoff (coarse) pitch, feather the fan, or even reverse the fan pitch in flight (with the fan providing reverse thrust in lieu of conventional reversers).

Development

Flying testbeds
Turbomeca owned two Rockwell Turbo Commander aircraft, and arranged for Miles Aircraft to modify each of them to accept two podded Astafan engines inboard of the nacelles. The nacelles were stripped of their turboshaft engines, and converted to carry extra fuel. One of the Turbo Commanders, a model 680V-TU, originally bore the experimental registry F-WSTM, and was later redesignated F-BSTM. The other Turbo Commander, F-BXAS, was either a 690A or B model.

Variants

Astafan I
First run as a prototype in 1969, and first flown in 1971, the Astafan I was derived from the core of the Astazou XIV turboshaft.

Astafan II

Astafan II
The basic Astafan II received its French certification in August 1972.

Astafan IIA
The Astafan IIA was certified in 1972. It differed from the earlier Astafan II by incorporating a new, larger-diameter fan with blades that had a greater range of motion (improving upon the marginal reverse thrust capability that existed in prior versions).

Astafan IIB4
Two IIB4s were installed on F-BSTM and used for testing and demonstration flights.

Astafan IIG
The IIG was installed on the prototype of Aérospatiale's Fouga 90 jet trainer (a development of the Fouga Magister). Using this medium-bypass version of the Astafan instead of the Turbomeca Marboré, the 90 had twice the range of the Magister (with a similar fuel load).

The IIG included the Astafan's characteristic variable-pitch fan, installed in front of an Astazou XVI core (comprising two axial compressor stages preceding a centrifugal compressor on a common shaft). The design also included an annular reverse-flow combustor and a three-stage turbine section. The resulting configuration yielded a bypass ratio of 8.8 and a pressure ratio of 9.1.

Astafan III
The Astafan III used the Astazou XVI core and a cooled turbine.

Astafan IV
The Astafan IV was based upon the Astazou XX turboshaft's core, and used three axial compressor stages before the Astazou-derived centrifugal compressor. The Astafan IV was considered for installation in the Fouga 90, as a more powerful alternative to the IIG.

Astafan IVF6
The IVF6 was tested on F-BXAS, and the engines were retained  during that aircraft's time as a company transport. This version of the engine output  of thrust at takeoff power.

Applications

Constructed
The Astafan was flown as a developmental engine on two aircraft types:
Rockwell Turbo Commander testbeds (several configurations)
Fouga 90 (Astafan IIG; prototype built and flown)

Proposed
Despite its many developmental variants, the Astafan was never produced in commercial quantities. Proposed installations included:
Ted Smith Super Star 3000 (Astafan II, concept abandoned when Aerostar was sold to Piper Aircraft)
Italair F.22 Jet Condor (Astafan II)
Fabrica Militar de Aviones IA 58 Pucará (Astafan IIs to replace turboprop engines)

Specifications (Astafan IV)

See also

References

External links 
Astafan testbed (Airliners.net)

High-bypass turbofan engines
Astafan
1960s turbofan engines
Geared turbofan engines
Centrifugal-flow turbojet engines